Valerii Chobotar (born 27 July 1993) is a Ukrainian karateka competing in the kumite 84 kg division. Valerii won silver medal at the 2018 Worlds in Madrid, Spain. He is 2017 and 2018 European Team Championships medalist.

In June 2021, he competed at the World Olympic Qualification Tournament held in Paris, France hoping to qualify for the 2020 Summer Olympics in Tokyo, Japan. In November 2021, he competed in the men's 84 kg event at the 2021 World Karate Championships held in Dubai, United Arab Emirates.

References

External links
 Ukrainian Karate Federation: Valerii Chobotar

1993 births
Living people
Ukrainian male karateka
European Games medalists in karate
Karateka at the 2019 European Games
European Games bronze medalists for Ukraine
Sportspeople from Chernivtsi